The 2016 Belgian Road Cycling Cup (known as the Napoleon Games Cycling Cup for sponsorship reasons) was the inaugural edition of the Belgian Road Cycling Cup and was won by Timothy Dupont.

Events

Race results
In each race, the top 20 riders scored points for the general classification.

Le Samyn

Handzame Classic

Heistse Pijl

Halle–Ingooigem

Dwars door het Hageland

Grote Prijs Jef Scherens

Kampioenschap van Vlaanderen

Eurométropole

Binche–Chimay–Binche

Nationale Sluitingsprijs

Final standings

Individual

Young rider classification

Teams

References

External links
  Official website
  Belgian Cycling Union Napoleon Games Cycling Cup Standings

Belgian Road Cycling Cup
Belgian Road Cycling Cup
Road Cycling Cup